Arfa is a village in Syria. Arfa may also refer to
Arfa (name)
Arfa Deh, a village in Iran
Arfa Software Technology Park in Pakistan
Alternative ribosome-rescue factor A